Gilles Simon was the defending champion, but chose not to participate that year.

Robby Ginepri won in the final, 6–2, 6–4, against Sam Querrey.

Seeds

Draw

Finals

Top half

Bottom half

References

External links
Main Draw
Qualifying Draw

Singles